East India Co. Grill and Bar is an Indian restaurant in Portland, Oregon.

Description

The restaurant is housed in downtown Portland's Medical Dental Building. The menu includes gosht vindaloo, murg makhani, navratan korma, and saag paneer.

History
Owners and spouses Anita and Prakash Reddy opened the restaurant in 2007. Pradeep Chandrana was the restaurant's chef and culinary director, as of 2011.

Reception
In 2008, Douglas Perry of The Oregonian gave the restaurant a 'B' rating. Ron Scott and Janey Wong included the restaurant in Eater Portland's 2022 list of "Where to Find Exceptional Indian Food in Portland".

See also
 List of Indian restaurants

References

External links
 
 East India Co. Grill & Bar at Zomato

2007 establishments in Oregon
Asian restaurants in Portland, Oregon
Indian restaurants in Oregon
Indian-American culture in Portland, Oregon
Restaurants established in 2007
Southwest Portland, Oregon